The Babbar Akali movement was a 1921 splinter group of "militant" Sikhs who broke away from the mainstream Akali movement over the latter's insistence on non-violence over gurdwara reforms.

The militant unit was established as Shahadat Dal (Association of Martyrs) in September 1920, later evolving into the Babbar Akali movement. By 1922, they had organized themselves into a military group and began killing informers, government officials, and ex-officials. They also published an illegal newspaper describing British exploitation of India. It was declared an unlawful association by the British in April 1923. They used religious imagery and discussed the loss of Sikh sovereignty in the First and Second Anglo-Sikh Wars, which helped them enjoy popular support. The Babbar Akali movement recruited from World War I veterans dissatisfied with broken land grant promises and former members of the Ghadar Party. Many of its members were killed in police encounters,  67 were taken alive and "5 were sentenced to death, 11 to transportation for life and 38 to various terms of imprisonment". Babbar Khalsa International was established in an attempt to emulate the Babbar Akalis.

History

The original Akali movement was established to peacefully get control of gurdwaras from heredity priests who were accused of enriching themselves. The Akalis took vows of nonviolence and observed them, however at Tarn Taran and Nankana Sahib in early 1921 the priests, their hired security killed a number of Sikhs. This resulted in the radicalization of the people who would form the core group of the Babbar Akalis.

References

Further reading
Babbar Akali Movement

Religiously motivated violence in India
Sikh politics
Indian independence movement